Per-Åke Tommy Persson (20 December 1946 – 27 June 2021), known by the stage name Peps Persson, was a Swedish blues and reggae musician and social critic from Tjörnarp, Scania. Throughout his career he mostly made music in Swedish and was well known for his Scanian dialect. At an earlier stage he made a few albums in English. His songs from the 1970s have become Swedish classics, including "Falsk matematik", which was number-one on Svensktoppen for 15 weeks.

Career
Persson was born on 20 December 1946 in Helsingborg and grew up in Tjörnarp. His first band, Pop Penders, was started in 1962. Persson's career up to 1975 was mostly inspired by the blues, and he's known for having reworked many famous blues and reggae tunes into Swedish, by such artists as Muddy Waters, Elmore James and Bob Marley.

After 1975, his career turned away from the blues and focused mostly on reggae. Some of his songs, like "Falsk matematik" and "Hög standard", made a political statement, and were considered part of the progg movement.

Persson died on 27 June 2021, at the age of 74, at his home in Vittsjö.

Discography

Solo career
Blues Connection (1968)
The Week Peps Came to Chicago (1972)
Blues på svenska (1975)
Rotrock (1980) –  23 in Sweden
En del och andra (1984) – No. 49 in Sweden
Oh Boy (1992)

Peps Blue Quality
Sweet Mary Jane (1969)

Peps Perssons Blodsband
Blodsband (1974)
Hög standard (1975)
Droppen urholkar stenen (1976)
Spår (1978)
Fram med pengarna! (1988)
Spelar för livet (1993)
Röster från Södern (1994) – No. 1 in Sweden
Rotblos (1997) – No. 32 in Sweden
Äntligen! (2005)

With Pelle Perssons Kapell
Fyra tunnlann bedor om dan (1977)
Persson sjonger Persson! (1982)

Compilations
Bitar 1968–1992 (1993) – No. 29 in Sweden
Bästa (2004) – No. 59 in Sweden
Oh Boy! – Det bästa med Peps Persson (2006) – No. 2 in Sweden

Singles
"Oh Boy!" (1992) – No. 43 in Sweden

References

External links 
Progg.se – Peps Persson
 
 

1946 births
2021 deaths
English-language singers from Sweden
People from Helsingborg
People from Höör Municipality
Swedish harmonica players
Swedish guitarists
Swedish male musicians
Swedish male singer-songwriters
Swedish reggae musicians
Swedish singer-songwriters
Swedish-language singers